is a Japanese shōjo manga series written and illustrated by Kaori Ozaki. It was first published in the Japanese monthly anthology Wings as Meteor Methuselah.  Eight volumes were published in English by Tokyopop.  The 10th volume was released in Japan in 2011. it is published in French by Doki-Doki.

Plot
A young assassin named Machika swears to kill the one bounty her grandfather could not get: the immortal Methuselah. But when she goes after him, she finds a clumsy, kind man named Rain who has lost more than he can bear in his unnatural lifetime. Unwilling to admit at first that she likes him, Machika willingly follows him as he waits for the one who made him immortal, still swearing to take his life one day. Their love for each other grows as they battle bounty hunters, a mysterious organization, and monstrous "angels" in order to save Rain and perhaps even humanity.

Characters

Main characters
Machika Balfaltin – At the beginning of the series, Machika is a fourteen-year-old assassin. Her grandfather, and presumably her only guardian, died a month before the series starts. Machika is a tomboy who shows little interest in men until she meets and falls in love with Rain. She is very determined and headstrong and never gives up hope. She later witnesses the horrible "death" of Rain and meets him a year later. Her grandfather was Zol the Assassin, which is why she first wanted to hunt down Rain, the only bounty her grandfather could never catch.
Rain Jewlitt – More commonly known as Methuselah, Rain is 624 years old. His immortality makes him famous, and he is the subject of numerous bounties. The cause of Rain's immortality is a mysterious man who appears in flashbacks early in the series. Rain is described as a "nice screw-up" and is one of the funniest characters. He falls in love with Machika as the story moves along. Tending to stay away from violence, he doesn't try to stay close to others because he fears their deaths. Rain in the flashbacks was shot and killed by Yuca and then 'reborn' by him after Yuca fed him Freya's (an infected subject) flesh and blood. Rain is the opposite of Yuca in many ways, and has told him he will never view life the way Yuca does. Rain has all the powers of an angel, but none of the drawbacks, and is considered a 'perfect immortal'. He has a relaxed, slightly off beat personality.
Sharem – In the earlier volumes, this beautiful woman is the villain. She is the subtly spirited, quick witted Vice President of a company called Calvaria which is trying to find the secret to immortality, eternal youth, and weapons of mass destruction. It is later revealed that Sharem is also the President's wife, and her son was victim to a tragic accident. She never got over the death of her son, especially considering after him she was no longer able to bear children. She adopts orphans with no place to go, provides for them and sees to their education, she is very much loved by them. She says at one point that she intended to marry for money not for love in reference to her husband and often taunts him seeing him as the cause for Ys' death. After her sister gives birth to Ishmael's second son, she adopts him as her own and names him "Ys" in memory of her old son. She doesn't know that her second son is also a reincarnation of Yuca. Machievelian and prepared to do anything to achieve what she considers her end. She is the tragic charmer of the series.
Yuca Collabel – This man is seen in Rain's flashbacks. His place and purpose is explained throughout the series. His main goal is to end human life as each time he dies he is reincarnated as another human being. Yuca is the reincarnation of the spirit of Methuselah, the name later applied to Rain. He wants to die eternally but the only way to guarantee his final death seems to be having no population left to birth him. After killing himself in front of Rain he reincarnates years later as Ishmael's son (his mother, who is Sharem's sister, immediately dies after giving birth to a child that is already in the form of a young boy), and Sharem names him "Ys" as she believes that he is the reincarnation of her son Ys. He has had experience creating "angels" in his previous "life" so during his life as Ys he creates numerous "angels" as devices for mass destruction. He was the person responsible for Freya's death and production of the biological weapons, and for Rain's immortality. He wants Rain to experience his pain and see his depression from being the person that he is. In a later volume, it is hinted that a part of Yuca secretly wants Rain to stop him.
Freya – A girl also seen in Rain's flashbacks. She was Rain's love interest until she was shot by Yuca. She played the violin, the one which Rain carries despite his inability to play. Since she was one of the infected "specimens" of Yuca's experimentations who had not yet transformed, her blood was used to immortalize Rain. Unfortunately for Rain, Freya loved Yuca more. Rain is constantly reminded of her when he's with Machika.
Kiki – A cat-like "angel" created 600 years before, at the time of Rain's making. He was rescued by the Doctor and given to Machika. In volume 5, Kiki begins to talk and has developed a taste for cat meat.
Zol the Grim Reaper – Machika's grandfather, and also the famous bounty hunter who was later assassinated. The only bounty that he could never catch was the immortal Methuselah. His trademark weapon was his scythe, which Machika now carries, and he was the closest person to Machika before she met Rain. There is a miniseries prequel about the encounter between Rain and Zol AKA Shinigami of the East in the Japanese Magazine "Huckleberry".

References

External links
 Innocent Bad – Kaori Ozaki's official website
 Immortal Rain on Tokyopop.com

1999 manga
Fantasy anime and manga
Shinshokan manga
Shōjo manga
Tokyopop titles